Colin Walter Rice (born 16 July 1938) is a former Australian rules footballer who played with Geelong in the Victorian Football League (VFL).

Rice made his debut for Geelong in 1957 and was capable of playing in both the back pocket and as a rover. He won the Carji Greeves Medal for Geelong's best and fairest player in 1959 and captained the club for part of 1960. Rice became a premiership player with his last game in the league, the 1963 grand final.

The following season he moved to Glenelg in the South Australian National Football League (SANFL) and was their Club Champion in his debut season.

He later played with the South Bendigo Football Club and won a Michelsen Medal in 1968.

External links

Australian rules footballers from Victoria (Australia)
Geelong Football Club players
Geelong Football Club Premiership players
Geelong Football Club captains
Glenelg Football Club players
South Bendigo Football Club players
Carji Greeves Medal winners
1938 births
Living people
One-time VFL/AFL Premiership players